Cedrasco is a comune (municipality) in the Province of Sondrio in the Italian region Lombardy, located about  northeast of Milan and about  west of Sondrio.

Cedrasco borders the following municipalities: Berbenno di Valtellina, Caiolo, Foppolo, Fusine, Postalesio.

Demographic evolution

References

External links
 www.comune.cedrasco.so.it

Cities and towns in Lombardy